HHB could refer to:

 Headquarters and Headquarters Battery, a US army unit
 Hermes House Band, a Dutch pop band
 Heysham Port railway station, in England
 Helsingør-Hornbæk Banen, a former railway company in Denmark